Surankote Tehsil is a tehsil of the Poonch district in the Indian union territory of Jammu and Kashmir. It is headquartered at the Surankote.

Administration
The Surankote tehsil is headquartered at Surankote.

Demographics

The total projected population of Surankote Tehsil is 124,755, with 65,699 males and 59,056 females according to the 2011 census of India. The population includes Paharis, Gujjars, Bakerwals and Kashmiris.

Transportation

Air
Poonch Airport is a non-operational airstrip in the district headquarters Poonch located 30 kilometres from Surankote. The nearest airport to Surankote is Sheikh ul-Alam International Airport in Srinagar, located 150 kilometres from Surankote.

Rail
There is no railway connectivity to Surankote. There are plans to construct the Jammu–Poonch line which will connect Jammu with the district headquarters Poonch with railways. The nearest major railway station is Jammu Tawi railway station located 210 kilometres from Surankote.

Road
The tehsil is well-connected to other places in Jammu and Kashmir and India by the NH 144A and other intra-district roads.

See also
Poonch
Jammu and Kashmir
Rajouri
Surankote
Jammu

References

External links
 The Official Website of Jammu and Kashmir Government, India
 Official Website of District Poonch, India
 Poonch Tehsil map, mapsofindia.com.

Poonch district, India